Ubba (Old Norse: Ubbi; died 878) was a 9th-century Viking and one of the commanders of the Great Heathen Army that invaded Anglo-Saxon England in the 860s. The Great Army appears to have been a coalition of warbands drawn from Scandinavia, Ireland, the Irish Sea region and Continental Europe. There is reason to suspect that a proportion of the Viking forces specifically originated in Frisia, where some Viking commanders are known to have held fiefdoms on behalf of the Franks.

In 865, the Great Army, apparently led by Ivar the Boneless, overwintered in the Kingdom of East Anglia, before invading and destroying the Kingdom of Northumbria. In 869, having been bought off by the Mercians, the Vikings conquered the East Angles, and in the process killed their king, Edmund, a man who was later regarded as a saint and martyr. While near-contemporary sources do not specifically associate Ubba with the latter campaign, some later, less reliable sources associate him with the legend of Edmund's martyrdom. In time, Ivar and Ubba came to be regarded as archetypal Viking invaders and opponents of Christianity. As such, Ubba features in several dubious hagiographical accounts of Anglo-Saxon saints and ecclesiastical sites. Non-contemporary sources also associate Ivar and Ubba with the legend of Ragnar Lodbrok, a figure of dubious historicity. Whilst there is reason to suspect that Edmund's cult was partly promoted to integrate Scandinavian settlers in Anglo-Saxon England, the legend of Ragnar Lodbrok may have originated in attempts to explain why they came to settle. Ubba is largely non-existent in the Icelandic traditions of Ragnar Lodbrok.

After the fall of the East Anglian kingdom, leadership of the Great Army appears to have fallen to Bagsecg and Halfdan, who campaigned against the Mercians and West Saxons. In 873, the Great Army is recorded to have split. Whilst Halfdan settled his followers in Northumbria, the army under Guthrum, Oscytel and Anwend struck out southwards and campaigned against the West Saxons. In the winter of 877–878, Guthrum launched a lightning attack deep into Wessex. There is reason to suspect that this strike was coordinated with the campaigning of a separate Viking force in Devon. According to a near-contemporary source, this force was led by a brother of Ivar and Halfdan, and some later sources identify this man as Ubba himself.

Origins of Ubba and the Great Army
In the mid-9th century, an invading Viking army coalesced in Anglo-Saxon England. The earliest version of the 9th- to 12th-century Anglo-Saxon Chronicle variously describes the invading host as "", an Old English term that can translate as "big army" or "great army". Archaeological evidence and documentary sources suggest that this Great Army was not a single unified force, but more of a composite collection of warbands drawn from different regions.

The exact origins of the Great Army are obscure. The Anglo-Saxon Chronicle sometimes identifies the Vikings as Danes. The 10th-century Vita Alfredi seems to allege that the invaders came from Denmark. A Scandinavian origin may be evinced by the 10th-century Chronicon Æthelweardi, which states that "the fleets of the tyrant Ivar" arrived in Anglo-Saxon England from "the north". By the mid-9th century, this Ivar (died 870/873) was one of the foremost Viking leaders in Britain and Ireland.

The Great Army may have included Vikings already active in Anglo-Saxon England, as well as men directly from Scandinavia, Ireland, the Irish Sea region and the Continent. There is reason to suspect that a proportion of the army specifically originated in Frisia. For example, the 9th-century Annales Bertiniani reveals that Danish Vikings devastated Frisia in 850, and the 12th-century Annales Lindisfarnenses et Dunelmenses states that a Viking force of Danes and Frisians made landfall on the Isle of Sheppey in 855.

Whilst the Old English Anglo-Saxon Chronicle calls the Viking army , the Latin Historia de sancto Cuthberto instead gives , a term of uncertain meaning that is employed three times in reference to the leadership of the Viking forces. One possibility is that the word means "people from the River Scheldt". This could indicate that Ubba was from Walcheren, an island in the mouth of the Scheldt. Walcheren is known to have been occupied by Danish Vikings over two decades before. For example, the Annales Bertiniani reports that Lothair I, King of Middle Francia (died 855) granted the island to a Viking named Herioldus in 841. Another possibility is that this term simply refers to Scyldings, an ancient lineage from which Danish monarchs of the time claimed descent.

According to the same source and the 9th-century Annales Fuldenses, another Viking named Roricus was granted a large part of Frisia as a benefice or fief from Lothair in 850. As men who held military and judicial authority on behalf of the Franks, Herioldus and Roricus can also be regarded as Frisian . Although it is uncertain whether Ubba was a native Frisian or a Scandinavian expatriate, if he was indeed involved with a Frisian benefice his forces would have probably been partly composed of Frisians. If his troops were drawn from the Scandinavian settlement started by Herioldus over two decades before, many of Ubba's men might well have been born in Frisia. In fact, the length of Scandinavian occupation suggests that some of the Vikings from Frisia would have been native Franks and Frisians. The considerable time that members of the Great Army appear to have spent in Ireland and on the Continent suggests that these men were well accustomed to Christian society, which in turn may partly explain their successes in Anglo-Saxon England.

Viking invasion of Anglo-Saxon England

In the autumn of 865, the Anglo Saxon Chronicle records that the Great Army invaded the Kingdom of East Anglia, where they afterwards made peace with the East Anglians and overwintered. The terminology employed by this source suggests the Vikings attacked by sea. The invaders evidently gained valuable intelligence during the stay, as the Great Army is next stated to have left on horses gained from the subordinated population, striking deep into the Kingdom of Northumbria, a fractured realm in the midst of a bitter civil war between two competing kings: Ælla (died 867) and Osberht (died 867).

Late in 866 the Vikings seized York—one of only two archiepiscopal sees in Anglo-Saxon England, and one of the richest trading centres in Britain. Although Ælla and Osberht responded to this attack by joining forces against the Vikings, the chronicle indicates that their assault on York was a disaster that resulted in both their deaths. According to Annales Lindisfarnenses et Dunelmenses, and Historia de sancto Cuthberto, the Northumbrians and their kings were crushed by Ubba himself.

Also that year, Annales Bertiniani reports that Charles II, King of West Francia (died 877) paid off a Viking fleet stationed on the Seine. After proceeding down the Seine towards the sea, where they repaired and rebuilt their fleet, a portion of the force is reported to have left for the district of IJssel (either Hollandse IJssel or Gelderse IJssel). Although the destination of the rest of the fleet is unrecorded, one possibility is that it participated in the sack of York. The fact that the Great Army remained in East Anglia for about a year before it attacked Northumbria could mean that it had been reinforced from the Continent during the layover. The part of the fleet that went to Frisia is later stated to have been unable to secure an alliance with Lothair. This statement seems to suggest that these Vikings had intended to acquire a grant of lands in the region, which could mean that they thereafter took part in the Great Army's campaigning across the Channel. Furthermore, Annales Bertiniani notes that Roricus was forced from Frisia the following year. This ejection could also account for the evidence of a Frisian dimension to the Great Army, and for the attestations of Ubba himself.

With the collapse of the Northumbrian kingdom, and the destruction of its regime, the 12th-century Historia regum Anglorum, and Libellus de exordio, reveal that a certain Ecgberht (died 873) was installed by the Vikings as client king over a northern region of Northumbria. In the following year, the Anglo-Saxon Chronicle records that the Great Army attacked Mercia, after which the Vikings seized Nottingham and overwintered there. Although the Mercian and West Saxon kings, Burgred (died 874?) and Æthelred (died 871), responded by joining forces and besieging the occupied town, both the chronicle and Vita Alfredi report that this combined Anglo-Saxon force was unable to dislodge the army. According to both sources, the Mercians made peace with the Vikings. It was probably on account of this seemingly purchased peace that the Great Army relocated to York, as reported by the chronicle, where it evidently renewed its strength for future forays.

Hagiographic association with Edmund

The earliest source to make specific note of Ubba is Passio sancti Eadmundi, which includes him in its account of the downfall of Edmund, King of East Anglia (died 869). Almost nothing is known of this king's career, and all that remains of his reign are a few coins. The first contemporary documentary source to cast any light upon his reign is the Anglo-Saxon Chronicle. According to this account, the Great Army invaded East Anglia in the autumn of 869, before setting up winter quarters at Thetford. The chronicle relates that the kingdom was conquered and Edmund was amongst the slain.

Although the specific wording employed by most versions of the chronicle suggests that Edmund was killed in battle, and Vita Alfredi certainly states as much—with neither source making note of a martyrdom ordeal—later hagiographical accounts portray the king in an idealised light, and depict his death in the context of a peace-loving Christian monarch, who willingly suffered martyrdom after refusing to shed blood in defence of himself.

One such account is Passio sancti Eadmundi, a source that makes no mention of a battle. Whilst this source's claim that Edmund was martyred after being captured is not implausible, the fact that he came to regarded as a martyr does not negate the possibility that he was slain in battle (as suggested by the Anglo-Saxon Chronicle). The apparent contradictory accounts of Edmund's demise given by these sources may stem from the telescoping of events surrounding an East Anglian military defeat and the subsequent arrest and execution of the king. In any case, surviving numismatic evidence of coins bearing Edmund's name—the so-called St Edmund memorial coinage—reveals that he was certainly regarded as a saint about twenty years after his death.

The reliability of Passio sancti Eadmundi is nevertheless uncertain. Although this source was composed over a century after the event, it may convey some credible material as the latest useful source. Nevertheless, there is also reason to suspect that the account is little more than a collection of well-known hagiographical elements, and that the composer knew little to nothing of Edmund's demise and early cult. The lurid depictions of Viking invaders presented by Passio sancti Eadmundi appears to owe much to the author's otherwise known association with Fleury, and specifically to the account of the Viking invasion of the Loire Valley detailed by Miracula sancti Benedicti, a 9th-century work composed by the Fleurian monk Adrevaldus (fl. 860s).

In specific regard to Ubba, Passio sancti Eadmundi states that Ivar left him in Northumbria before launching his assault upon the East Angles in 869. If this source is to be believed, it could indicate that Ubba stayed behind to ensure the cooperation of the conquered Northumbrians. Although Vita Alfredi and the Anglo-Saxon Chronicle fail to note any Viking garrisons in the conquered Anglo-Saxon kingdoms, this may merely be a consequence of their otherwise perceptible West Saxon bias. In contrast to Passio sancti Eadmundi, the 12th-century "F" version of the Anglo-Saxon Chronicle specifically identifies Ubba and Ivar as the chiefs of the men who killed the king. Whilst this identification could be derived from Passio sancti Eadmundi or the 10th-century Lives of the Saints, it could merely be a mistake on the chronicler's part. In any case, later and less reliable literature covering the martyrdom associates both men with the event, revealing that this version of events was current as early as the 12th century.

Hagiographic association with Æbbe and Osyth

Ubba is associated with the martyrdom of Æbbe, an alleged abbess of Coldingham said to have been slain by Vikings in 870. The historicity of this woman is nevertheless uncertain. The earliest accounts of the alleged events at Coldingham date to the 13th century. They include Chronica majora, and both the Wendover and Paris versions of Flores historiarum. According to these sources, Æbbe compelled the nuns of Coldingham to disfigure themselves to preserve their virginity from an incoming horde of Vikings. Leading by example, Æbbe is said to have cut off her nose and upper lip with a razor. When the Viking arrived the following morning, the sight of the mutilated and bloody women repelled the raiders. Nevertheless, Ivar and Ubba are stated to have ordered the razing of the monastery, burning to death Æbbe and her faithful nuns.

Despite many lurid 12th-century tales of ecclesiastical devastation wrought by Vikings, the principal contemporary source for this period, the 9th- or 10th-century "A" version of the Anglo-Saxon Chronicle, fails to note the destruction of a single Anglo-Saxon church by Scandinavians during the 8th and 9th centuries. Although Passio sancti Eadmundi presents the invasion of East Anglia by Ubba and Ivar as a campaign of wanton rape and murder, the account does not depict the destruction of the kingdom's monasteries. In fact, there is reason to suspect that most Anglo-Saxon monastic sites probably survived the Viking invasions of the era, and that the East Anglian Church withstood the Viking invasions and occupation.

Whilst Viking depredations of monasteries tend not to feature in sources intended for royal audiences, religious desecrations appear in sources composed for ecclesiastical audiences. There are several reasons why 12th-century sources associate the Vikings with seemingly unhistorical atrocities against particular monasteries. For example, such depredations could explain changes in monastic observance, or the switch from monastic- to clerical observance. Stories of Viking attacks could be used as evidence of the former possession of property claimed by religious houses centuries after the fact. The 9th-century Viking onslaught may have also been a way in which 12th-century commentators sought to explain what was regarded as monastic decay in 10th-century Anglo-Saxon England. This imagined or exaggerated religious extirpation could well have been a convenient way of accounting for the scarcity of documentary evidence concerning early religious institutions. Twelfth-century ecclesiastical historians availed themselves of sources such as the Anglo-Saxon Chronicle and Passio sancti Eadmundi. The fact that the latter was particularly influential to mediaeval historians is evidenced by the frequent occurrences of Ivar and Ubba in reports of religious atrocities. To medieval hagiographers and historians, these two figures were archetypal Viking invaders and emblematic opponents of Christianity.

The accounts of Æbbe could be an example of such a constructed tale. The story appears be ultimately derived from the account of Coldingham preserved by the eighth-century Historia ecclesiastica. According to this source, Æthelthryth (died 679), wife of Ecgfrith, King of Northumbria (died 685), entered the monastery under the tutelage of an abbess named Æbbe (died 683?). At some point after Æthelthryth left Coldingham to found a monastery at Ely, Historia ecclesiastica reports that the monastery of Coldingham burned to the ground. This account of Coldingham's burning was later incorporated into Liber Eliensis, a 12th-century chronicle covering the history of Æthelthryth's establishment at Ely. The account of the burning given by Historia ecclesiastica may well be the inspiration behind the tale of facial mutilation and fiery martyrdom first associated with Coldingham by the Wendover version of Flores historiarum. To 12th-century ecclesiasts, invented tales of 9th-century violence—particularly violence inflicted by Ivar and Ubba—may have been intended to validate the refoundation of certain religious communities.

The earliest Anglo-Saxon virgin-martyr is Osyth. A now-lost 12th-century  of this woman associated Ivar and Ubba with her seventh-century martyrdom. According to this source, Ivar and Ubba commanded the pirates who beheaded her after she refused to worship their pagan idols. This work may have been the inspiration behind the Anglo-Norman hagiography Vie seinte Osith, a composition that also attributes Osyth's killing to Ivar and Ubba and their followers.

The Great Army after Ivar

The history of East Anglia immediately after Edmund's demise is extremely obscure. The account of events presented by Passio sancti Eadmundi seems to show that Edmund was killed in the context of the Great Army attempting to impose authority over him and his realm. Such an accommodation appears to have been gained by the Vikings in Northumbria and Mercia. In any case, numismatic evidence appears to indicate that two client kings—a certain Æthelred and Oswald—thereafter ruled over the East Angles on behalf of the Viking conquerors.

It is at about this point that Ivar disappears from English history. According to Chronicon Æthelweardi, he died in the same year as Edmund. However, this record may partly stem from the fact that he did not take part in the subsequent war against the Kingdom of Wessex, beginning in the autumn or winter of 870. In any case, the leadership of the Great Army appears to have fallen to kings Bagsecg (died 871) and Halfdan (died 877), the first principal Viking leaders attested by all versions of the Anglo-Saxon Chronicle after the army's recorded arrival.

For about a year, the Great Army campaigned against the West Saxons, before overwintering in London. Late in 872, after spending nearly a year in London, the Vikings were drawn back to Northumbria, and afterwards to Mercia. By the end of 874, the kingdoms of East Anglia, Mercia and Northumbria were finally broken. At this point, the Great Army split. Whilst Halfdan settled his followers in Northumbria, the army under Guthrum (died 890), Oscytel (fl. 875) and Anwend (fl. 875), struck out southwards, and based itself at Cambridge. In 875, the Vikings invaded Wessex and seized Wareham. Although Alfred, King of Wessex (died 899) sued for peace in 876, the Vikings broke the truce the following year, seized Exeter, and were finally forced to withdraw back to Mercia.

Although much of Guthrum's army started to settle in Mercia, the Anglo-Saxon Chronicle and Vita Alfredi reveal that Guthrum launched a surprise attack against the West Saxons in the winter of 877/878. Setting off from their base in Gloucester, the latter source specifies that the Vikings drove deep into Wessex, and sacked the royal vill of Chippenham.

Battle of 

Most versions of the Anglo-Saxon Chronicle locate the battle to Devon. Vita Alfredi specifies that it was fought at a fortress called , a name which appears to equate to what is today Countisbury, in North Devon. This source also states that the Vikings made landfall in Devon from a base in Dyfed, where they had previously overwintered. As such, the Viking army could have arrived in Dyfed from Ireland, and overwintered in Wales before striking forth into Devon.

The Anglo-Saxon Chronicle does not identify the army's commander by name. It merely describes him as a brother of Ivar and Halfdan, and observes that he was slain in the encounter. Although Ubba is identified as the slain commander by the 12th-century Estoire des Engleis, it is unknown whether this identification is merely an inference by its author, or if it is derived from an earlier source. For example, this identification could have been influenced by the earlier association of Ubba and Ivar in the legends surrounding Edmund's martyrdom. In any case, Estoire des Engleis further specifies that Ubba was slain at ""—which may refer to Penselwood, near the Somerset–Wiltshire border—and buried in Devon within a mound called "".

The clash at  culminated in a West Saxon victory. Whilst Vita Alfredi attributes the outcome to unnamed thegns of Alfred, Chronicon Æthelweardi identifies the victorious commander as Odda, Ealdorman of Devon (fl. 878). Most versions of the Anglo-Saxon Chronicle number the Viking fleet at twenty-three ships, and most versions number the Viking casualties at eight hundred and forty dead. These numbers roughly give about thirty-six-and-a-half men per ship, which is comparable to the 32-oared Gokstad ship, a 9th-century Viking ship unearthed in Norway.

On one hand, it is possible that the Viking commander at  seized upon Guthrum's simultaneous campaigning against the West Saxons to launch a Viking foray of his from Dyfed. On the other hand, the location and timing of the engagement at  may indicate that the slain commander was cooperating with Guthrum. As such, there is reason to suspect that the two Viking armies coordinated their efforts in an attempt to corner Alfred in a pincer movement after his defeat at Chippenham and subsequent withdrawal into the wetlands of Somerset.

It is possible that the defeat at  left Guthrum overextended in Wessex, allowing Alfred's forces to assail Guthrum's exposed lines of communication. Although Alfred's position may have been still perilous in the aftermath, with his contracted kingdom close to collapse, the victory at  certainly foreshadowed a turn of events for the West Saxons. A few weeks later in May, the Anglo-Saxon Chronicle records that Alfred was able to assemble his troops, and launch a successful attack against Guthrum at Edington. Following Guthrum's crushing defeat, the Vikings were forced to accept Alfred's terms for peace. Guthrum was baptised as a Christian, and led the remainder of his forces into East Anglia, where they dispersed and settled. Guthrum thereafter kept peace with the West Saxons, and ruled as a Christian king for more than a decade, until his death in 890.

Medieval legend of Ragnar Lodbrok

Although Ubba and Ivar are associated with each other by Passio sancti Eadmundi, the men are not stated to be related in any way. The earliest source claiming kinship between the two is the Annals of St Neots, an 11th- or 12th-century account stating that they were brothers of three daughters of Lodbrok. This source further states that these three sisters wove a magical banner named  that was captured at the  conflict. Although certain versions of the Anglo-Saxon Chronicle also note the capture of a raven banner, named  ("Raven"), they do not mention any magical attributes, or refer to Lodbrok and his progeny.

Lodbrok appears to be an early reference to Ragnar Lodbrok, a saga character of dubious historicity, who could be an amalgam of several historical 9th-century figures. According to Scandinavian sources, Ragnar Lodbrok was a Scandinavian of royal stock, whose death at the hands of Ælla in Northumbria was the catalyst of the invasion of Anglo-Saxon England—and Ælla's own destruction—by Ragnar Lodbrok's vengeful sons. None of the saga-sources for the legend of Ragnar Lodbrok accord him a son that corresponds to Ubba. The latter is only specifically attested by sources dealing with the East Scandinavian tradition. One of these sources is the 13th-century Gesta Danorum. According to this text, Ubba was the son of Ragnar Lodbrok and an unnamed daughter of a certain Hesbernus. Gesta Danorum does not associate Ubba with Anglo-Saxon England in any way. According to the 13th- or 14th-century Ragnarssona þáttr, a source that forms part of the West Scandinavian tradition, Ivar had two bastard brothers, Yngvar and Husto, who tortured Edmund on Ivar's instructions. No other source mentions these sons. It is possible that these figures represent Ivar and Ubba, and that the composer of Ragnarssona þáttr failed to recognise the names of Ivar and Ubba in English sources concerned with the legend of Edmund's martyrdom.

Whilst Scandinavian sources—such as the 13th-century Ragnars saga loðbrókar—tend to locate the legend of Ragnar Lodbrok in a Northumbrian context, English sources tend to place them in an East Anglian setting. The earliest source to specifically associate the legend with East Anglia is Liber de infantia sancti Eadmundi, a 12th-century account depicting the Viking invasion of East Anglia in the context of a dynastic dispute. According to this source, Lodbrok was extremely envious of Edmund's fame. As such, it is Lodbrok's taunts that provoke his sons, Ivar, Ubba and Björn, to slay Edmund and destroy his kingdom. Although this text is heavily dependent upon Passio sancti Eadmundi for its depiction of Edmund's death, it appears to be the first source to meld the martyrdom with the legend of Ragnar Lodbrok.

By the 13th century an alternate rendition of the story appears in sources such as Chronica majora, and both the Wendover and Paris versions of Flores historiarum. For example, the Wendover account states that Lodbrok washed ashore in East Anglia, where he was honourably received by Edmund, but afterwards murdered by Björn, an envious huntsman. Although the latter is expelled from the realm, he convinces Lodbrok's sons, Ivar and Ubba, that the killer of their father was Edmund. As such, East Anglia is invaded by these two sons, and Edmund is killed in a case of misplaced vengeance. A slightly different version of events is offered by Estoire des Engleis, which states that the Vikings invaded Northumbria on behalf of Björn, who sought vengeance for the rape of his wife by the Northumbrian king, Osberht. On one hand, it is possible that the theme of vengeance directed at Edmund is derived from the tradition of Ælla's demise in Northumbria at the hands of Ragnar's progeny. On the other hand, the revenge motifs and miraculous maritime journeys presented in the accounts of Edmund are well-known elements commonly found in contemporaneous chivalric romances.

There is reason to suspect that the legend of Ragnar Lodbrok originated from attempts to explain why the Vikings came to settle in Anglo-Saxon England. The core of the tradition may have been constructed as a way to rationalise their arrival without assigning blame to either side (as illustrated by the sympathetic Wendover account). As such, the legend could have been intended to justify Edmund's violent demise. The tales may have evolved at an early stage of Viking settlement, and may have functioned as an origin myth of the emerging Anglo-Scandinavian culture. The shared kinship assigned to Ivar and Ubba within the legend of Ragnar Lodbrok may stem from their combined part in Edmund's downfall as opposed to any historical familial connection.

In popular culture

Ubba appears as a character in modern historical fiction. For example, the unnamed Danish king that appears in Alfred: A Masque, a musical play with a libretto by James Thomson (died 1748) and David Mallet (died 1765)—first presented in 1740—may be a composite of Ubba, Guthrum, Ivar and Halfdan. Ubba certainly appears in Alfred the Great, Deliverer of His Country, an anonymous play that first appears on record in 1753; and The Magick Banner; or, Two Wives in a House, a play by John O'Keeffe (died 1833), first presented in 1796. He also appears in the Sketch of Alfred the Great: Or, the Danish Invasion, a ballet by Mark Lonsdale, first performed in 1798; and Alfred; An Epic Poem, a long piece of epic poetry by Henry James Pye (died 1813), published in 1801; and the similarly named Alfred, an Epic Poem, by Joseph Cottle (died 1853)—a poem almost twice as long as Pye's—first published in 1800.

Ubba later appears in Alfred the Great; Or, The Enchanted Standard, a musical drama by Isaac Pocock (died 1835), based upon O'Keeffe's play, and first performed in 1827; and Alfred the Great, a play by James Magnus, dating to 1838. He further appears in Alfred of Wessex, an epic poem by Richard Kelsey, published in 1852; and in the 1899 novel King Alfred's Viking, by Charles Whistler (died 1913); and the 2004 novel The Last Kingdom by Bernard Cornwell. Ubba is also a character in Vikings, a television series first aired on the History network in 2013. His name was changed to Ubbe, and he was portrayed by Jordan Patrick Smith from season 4B through the end.

In 2015, BBC Two released The Last Kingdom, a fictional television series (based upon Cornwell's The Saxon Chronicles series of novels). It was later aired on Netflix. Although the series and many of its characters were based on real events and people, the series also contains fictional events. The character was portrayed a little differently than the real-life Ubba. Ubba is played by actor Rune Temte.

Ubba, Halfdan and Ivar the Boneless appear in the Ubisoft video game Assassin's Creed Valhalla as brothers, sharing significant roles in the story of Viking conquests of England during the 9th century.

Notes

Citations

References

Primary sources

Secondary sources

External links

878 deaths
9th-century Vikings
Viking warriors
Vikings killed in battle
Year of birth unknown